Zbigniew Lengren (2 February 1919 in Tula – 1 October 2003 in Warsaw) was a Polish cartoonist, caricaturist, and illustrator, of Swedish descent.  He was awarded the "Order of Smile" amongst other, numerous awards. His most famous creation is Professor Filutek, who appeared once a week on the last page of Przekrój magazine, together with his dog Filuś, for over 50 years, a record run in Polish comics. Lengren was also a writer, especially of poems for children.

In 1947, whilst a Fine Arts student of the Nicolaus Copernicus University, he won a competition to design the Super Ex Libris for the University Library. The design is still in use today.

References

External links
  Zbigniew Lengren - film posters at the Cinemaposter.com

1919 births
2003 deaths
20th-century Polish people
Polish cartoonists
Polish caricaturists
Polish comics artists
Polish illustrators
Polish people of Swedish descent
Nicolaus Copernicus University in Toruń alumni
Children's poets